Low-Flying Aircraft (original title Aparelho Voador a Baixa Altitude, literally "Flying machines at low altitude") is a 2002 Portuguese film from Swedish director Solveig Nordlund. Its main actors are Miguel Guilherme and Margarida Marinho.  The film was based on the 1975 short story "Low Flying Aircraft" by J. G. Ballard.

Margarida Marinho's performance was nominated in 2003 for the Golden Globe, Portugal for Best Actress in a Motion Picture.

References and external links

"Like Alice in Wonderland": Solveig Nordlund on J.G. Ballard  Rick McGrath interviews Solveig Nordlund about her feature film, Aparelho Voador a Baixa Altitude (2002).
 

Portuguese science fiction films
Aviation films
Films based on short fiction
Films based on works by J. G. Ballard